Farida Rahman (16 September 1945 – 18 May 2021) was a Bangladesh Awami League politician and a Jatiya Sangsad member from the reserved women's seat-17 from 2009 until 2013.

References

1945 births
2021 deaths
Awami League politicians
Women members of the Jatiya Sangsad
9th Jatiya Sangsad members
21st-century Bangladeshi women politicians
21st-century Bangladeshi politicians
Place of birth missing
20th-century Bangladeshi women politicians